Joe or Joseph Reilly could refer to: 
 
Joe Reilly (baseball) (1861–?), American professional second baseman
Joe Reilly (American football) (1880–1951), American athlete and coach  
Joe Reilly (Australian footballer) (1916–2003), Australian athlete and coach
Joseph M. Reilly (1927–2012), American politician
Joseph John Reilly, professor of English

See also
Joe O'Reilly (disambiguation)
Joe Riley (disambiguation)